Wetter may refer to:
 Wetter (surname)
 Wetter (Ruhr), a town in the Ruhr area, Germany
 Wetter, Hesse, a town in Hesse, Germany
 Wetter (river), a minor river in Hessen, Germany
 Vättern, a lake in Sweden
 "Wetter" (song), a 2009 song by the rapper Twista

See also
 Wētā, an extremely large grasshopper-like insect endemic to New Zealand
 Weather (disambiguation) ( in German)